Ain't Had Enough Fun is the 11th studio album by the American rock band Little Feat, released in 1995 (see 1995 in music). It was their first with female vocalist Shaun Murphy, and was dedicated to the memory of their cover artist Neon Park who died in 1993.

Track listing
 "Drivin' Blind" (Bill Payne, Wray) – 5:12
 "Blue Jean Blues" (Barrère, Payne, Fred Tackett, Wray) – 6:06
 "Cadillac Hotel" (Payne, Wray) – 5:35
 "Romance Without Finance" (Clayton, Kibbee, Payne) – 4:05
 "Big Bang Theory" (Barrère, Murphy, Payne, Tackett, Wray) – 5:32
 "Cajun Rage" (Barrère, Kibbee, Wray) – 5:30
 "Heaven's Where You Find It" (Barrère, Murphy, Payne, Tackett) – 5:03
 "Borderline Blues" (Barrère, Murphy, Payne, Tackett, Wray) – 7:43
 "All That You Can Stand" (Barrère, Payne, Wray) – 6:35
 "Rock & Roll Everynight" (Barrère, Murphy, Payne, Tackett, Wray) – 5:06
 "Shakeytown" (Barrère, Kibbee) – 5:12
 "Ain't Had Enough Fun" (Barrère, Murphy, Payne, Strand, Tackett) – 3:27
 "That's a Pretty Good Love" (Lucas, Mendelsohn) – 4:50

Band members
Paul Barrère – guitar, dobro, vocals
Sam Clayton – percussion, vocals
Kenny Gradney – bass
Richie Hayward – drums, vocals
Shaun Murphy – vocals, percussion (first album as group member)
Bill Payne – keyboards, vocals
Fred Tackett – guitar, mandolin

Texicali Horns
These guys play on tracks 2, 3, 10, & 13
Darrell Leonard – trumpet
Joe Sublett – tenor saxophone
David Woodford – tenor and baritone saxophone

Additional personnel
Piero Mariani – electronic percussion (tracks 1,2,6-9)
Van Dyke Parks – accordion (track 12)

References

1995 albums
Little Feat albums
Albums produced by Bill Payne
Albums with cover art by Neon Park